The Radio One Sessions is a live album by former Pink Floyd vocalist and guitarist, Syd Barrett. It is the last Barrett album released in his lifetime before his death in 2006.

Content
It features the complete Peel Session recordings that Barrett did for Top Gear (presented by Peel) on 24 February 1970, plus three unreleased songs recorded for a Bob Harris "Sounds of the Seventies" show on 16 February 1971. For the latter, the BBC no longer held the master tape, however, the source tape used for this album was an off-air bootleg recording of the show made during its original broadcast. Because a several generation old tape was used, the quality of these tracks is very poor, but in recent years, a lower generation copy, featuring Harris' introductions, has circulated among fans and has improved sound quality.

Track listing
All songs by Syd Barrett (with the possible exception of "Two of a Kind").

 "Terrapin" – 3:09
 "Gigolo Aunt" – 3:42
 "Baby Lemonade" – 2:34
 "Effervescing Elephant" – 1:02
 "Two of a Kind" (Rick Wright) – 2:35
 "Baby Lemonade" – 2:23
 "Dominoes" – 3:02
 "Love Song" – 1:27

Personnel
Syd Barrett – acoustic guitar, vocals
David Gilmour – bass guitar, organ, electric guitar, backing vocals
Jerry Shirley – percussion
Pete Dauncey – producer
John Muir – producer
Barry Plummer – cover photo

See also
The Peel Session

References
Footnotes

Citations

Syd Barrett live albums
BBC Radio recordings
2004 live albums
2004 compilation albums